Piotrowice  is a village in the administrative district of Gmina Kostomłoty, within Środa Śląska County, Lower Silesian Voivodeship, in south-western Poland.

History
Piotrowice dates back to the Middle Ages. The oldest known mention of the village comes from a document from 1221. It was the location of a medieval motte-and-bailey castle, which is now an archaeological site. 

In January 1945, in the village, the Germans carried out a mass execution of a group of 154 prisoners during a death march from the subcamp in Miłoszyce to the Gross-Rosen concentration camp. Two mass graves were discovered in 1970 and 1977.

Transport
The Polish east–west A4 motorway, which is part of the European route E40, passes nearby, south of the village.

Sports
The local football club is KS Piotrowice. It competes in the lower leagues.

References

Villages in Środa Śląska County
Archaeological sites in Poland
Nazi war crimes in Poland